Litobrenthia is a genus of moths in the family Choreutidae.

Species
Litobrenthia angustipunctata Budashkin & Li, 2009
Litobrenthia grammodes Diakonoff, 1979
Litobrenthia japonica (Issiki, 1930)
Litobrenthia luminifera (Meyrick, 1912)
Litobrenthia stephanephora Diakonoff, 1979
Litobrenthia tetartodipla (Diakonoff, 1978)

Former species
Litobrenthia carola (Meyrick, 1912)
Litobrenthia coronigera (Meyrick, 1918)
Litobrenthia cyanaula (Meyrick, 1912)
Litobrenthia leptocosma (Meyrick, 1916)

References

External links
choreutidae.lifedesks.org

Choreutidae